Three ships of the Royal Navy have borne the name HMS Derwent:

  was a  launched in 1807 and sold in 1817. Along with  they were the first ships in the West Africa Squadron which was established to interdict and end the Trans Atlantic Slave Trade.
  was a  launched in 1903 and sunk by a mine in 1917.
  was a  launched in 1940. She was damaged by a torpedo in 1943 and not repaired, being scrapped in 1947.

See also
 

Royal Navy ship names